Pelistega europaea is a gram-negative, aerobic bacterium from the genus of Pelistega which can cause respiratory disease in pigeons.

References

External links
Type strain of Pelistega europaea at BacDive -  the Bacterial Diversity Metadatabase

Burkholderiales
Bacteria described in 1998